Yuen Woo-ping (alias: Yuen Wo-ping; born 1945) is a Hong Kong martial arts choreographer and film director who worked in Hong Kong action cinema and later Hollywood films. He is one of the inductees on the Avenue of Stars in Hong Kong. Yuen is also a son of Yuen Siu-tien, a martial arts film actor.

Life and career
Yuen was born in Guangzhou, Guangdong, China. With a support of Ng See-yuen, he achieved his first directing credit in 1978 on the seminal Snake in the Eagle's Shadow, starring Jackie Chan, followed quickly by Drunken Master. The films were smash hits, launching Jackie Chan as a major film star, turning Seasonal Films into a major independent production company, and starting a trend towards comedy in martial arts films that continues to the following two decades.

Yuen went on to work with such figures as Sammo Hung in Magnificent Butcher (1979), Yuen Biao in Dreadnaught (1981), Donnie Yen in Iron Monkey (1993), and Jet Li and Michelle Yeoh in Tai Chi Master (1993), and Wing Chun (1994).

Yuen's works, particularly his action choreography on Fist of Legend (1994), attracted the attention of the Wachowskis, who hired him as the martial arts choreographer on The Matrix (1999). The success of this collaboration, plus his action choreography on the following year's hit Crouching Tiger, Hidden Dragon, made him a highly sought after figure in Hollywood. He went on to work on the Matrix sequels and Kill Bill (2003).

More recent action choreography duties in Hong Kong cinema have included Kung Fu Hustle (2004), starring Stephen Chow, and Fearless (2006), starring Jet Li.

Yuen also choreographed the action sequences in The Forbidden Kingdom (2008), a Hollywood martial arts–adventure film, which was the first film to star together two of the best-known names in the martial arts film genre, Jackie Chan and Jet Li. He worked as a fight choreography consultant on Ninja Assassin (2009).

In late 2010, Yuen released his first film as director since 1996, True Legend, starring Vincent Zhao, Jay Chou and David Carradine (in a minor role).

Yuen went on to work as stunt co-ordinator in two South Indian films, Enthiran (2010) and I (2014), both directed by S. Shankar.

In 2015, Yuen directed Crouching Tiger, Hidden Dragon: Sword of Destiny,  re-creating many of his signature action choreographies.

The annual and highly anticipated Hong Kong International Film Festival was held for its 45th edition in April 2021. Yuen is one of the six veteran Hong Kong filmmakers who contributed segments to the Johnnie To-produced anthology film Septet: The story of Hong Kong. The other filmmakers who directed segments are Sammo Hung, Ann Hui On-wah, Patrick Tam, Tsui Hark and Ringo Lam. The short files were shot entirely on 35mm film with each of them touches on a nostalgic and moving story set across different time periods, with every one acting as an ode to the city.

Filmography

As director

 Snake in the Eagle's Shadow  (1978)  (Cantonese title: Se ying diu sau)
 Drunken Master (1978) (Cantonese title: Jui kuen)
 Dance of the Drunk Mantis  (1979) (Mandarin title: Nan bei zui quan)
 Magnificent Butcher (1979) (Mandarin title: Lin shi rong)
 The Buddhist Fist (1980) (Mandarin title: Fo Zhang luo han quan)
 Dreadnaught (1981) (Mandarin title: Yong zhe wu ju)
 The Miracle Fighters  (1982) (Qi men dun jia)
 Legend of a Fighter  (1982) (Huo Yuan-Jia)
 Shaolin Drunkard  (1983) (Tian shi zhuang xie)
 Drunken Tai Chi  (1984) (Xiao tai ji)
 Mismatched Couples (1985) (Qing feng di shou)
 Dragon Vs. Vampire (a.k.a. The Close Encounters of Vampire) (1986) (Jiang shi pa pa)
 Tiger Cage (1988) (Te jing tu long)
 In the Line of Duty 4: Witness (1989) (Huang jia shi jie zhi IV: Zhi ji zheng ren)
 a.k.a. In the Line of Duty
 a.k.a. In the Line of Duty IV
 a.k.a. Yes, Madam 4
 Tiger Cage 2 (1990) (Xi hei qian)
 Tiger Cage 3 (1991) (Leng mian ju ji shou)
 Su qi er (1993)
 a.k.a. Fist of the Red Dragon (USA: video title)
 a.k.a. Heroes Among Heroes
 Iron Monkey (1993)
 Tai Chi Master (1993)
 Wing Chun (1994)
 Huo yun chuan qi (1994)
 a.k.a. Fire Dragon
 Hu meng wei long (1995)
 a.k.a. Red Wolf
 Tai ji quan (1996)
 a.k.a. Tai Chi Boxer (Hong Kong: English title) (UK: literal English title)
 a.k.a. Tai Chi 2
 True Legend (2010)
 a.k.a. True Legend of Beggar Su (Working title)
 Crouching Tiger, Hidden Dragon: Sword of Destiny (2016)
 The Thousand Faces of Dunjia (2017)
 Master Z: The Ip Man Legacy (2018)
 Septet: The Story of Hong Kong (2020)

Selected filmography as action choreographer/fight advisor
 The Bloody Fists (1972)
 The Awaken Punch (1973)
 Born Invincible (1978)
 Drunken Master (1978)
 Fist of Legend (1994)
 Black Mask (1996)
 The Water Margin (1998)
 The Matrix (1999)
 Crouching Tiger, Hidden Dragon (2000)
 The Matrix Reloaded (2003)
 The Matrix Revolutions (2003)
 Kill Bill: Volume 1 (2003)
 Kill Bill: Volume 2 (2004)
 Kung Fu Hustle (2004)
 Danny the Dog (a.k.a. Unleashed) (2005)
 House of Fury (2005)
 Fearless (2006)
 The Forbidden Kingdom (2008)
 Enthiran (2010)
 The Grandmaster (2013)
 Once Upon a Time in Shanghai (2013)
 Man of Tai Chi (2013)
 I (2015)
 Ip Man 3 (2015)
 Gong Shou Dao (2017)
Ip Man 4: The Finale (2019)

Actor
 Mismatched Couples (1985) as Mini
 Eastern Condors  (1987) as Grandpa Yun Yen-hoy
 The Wicked City (1992) as Sergeant Kayama
 The Grandmaster (2013) as Chan Wah-shun
 Man of Tai Chi (2013) as Man at fight club (uncredited)

Awards and nominations

References

 http://www.chinesefilms.cn/141/2012/11/06/122s12782.htm
 http://www.ign.com/articles/2013/05/17/weinstein-updates-crouching-tiger-sequel

External links
 
 Associated Press article about Yuen including quotes from Ronny Yu and Jet Li

1945 births
Action choreographers
Male actors from Guangzhou
Cantonese people
Chinese choreographers
Male actors from Guangdong
Film directors from Guangdong
Hong Kong male film actors
Hong Kong film directors
Hong Kong film producers
Hong Kong kung fu practitioners
20th-century Hong Kong male actors
21st-century Hong Kong male actors
Living people
Chinese male film actors
Chinese film directors